Ralph Laurence See (born June 20, 1960 in Norwalk, California) is a former first baseman. He played in 26 games for the Los Angeles Dodgers and Texas Rangers during the 1986 and 1988 baseball seasons.

Career
After leaving the Rangers organization in 1988, he played in the Mexican League through 1994 before attempting a comeback with the San Diego Padres. He played in the minors for the Padres in 1995, with the Rancho Cucamonga Quakes and Las Vegas Stars.

He then managed the Arizona League Padres in 1996 and played in the Northern League for the Thunder Bay Whiskey Jacks and Duluth–Superior Dukes from 1997–1999.

In 2013, he joined the coaching staff of the Phoenix Prospectors in the Freedom Pro Baseball League.

External links

1960 births
Living people
Albuquerque Dukes players
American expatriate baseball players in Mexico
Baseball players from California
Cerritos Falcons baseball players
Charros de Jalisco players
Diablos Rojos del México players
Duluth-Superior Dukes players
Las Vegas Stars (baseball) players
Lethbridge Dodgers players
Los Angeles Dodgers players
Major League Baseball first basemen
Minor league baseball managers
Oklahoma City 89ers players
People from Norwalk, California
Rancho Cucamonga Quakes players
Rieleros de Aguascalientes players
San Antonio Dodgers players
Saraperos de Saltillo players
Sultanes de Monterrey players
Texas Rangers players
Thunder Bay Whiskey Jacks players
Toledo Mud Hens players
Vero Beach Dodgers players